Change or Die may refer to
 "Change or Die", a song by Papa Roach from the album Metamorphosis
 "Change or Die" (comics), a story from the comic book series Stormwatch.